Minuscule 919 (in the Gregory-Aland numbering), α113 (von Soden), is an 11th-century Greek minuscule manuscript of the New Testament on parchment. The manuscript has not survived in complete condition.

Description 

The codex contains the text of the Book of Acts, Catholic epistles, Pauline epistles, and Book of Revelation, on 265 parchment leaves (size ) with some lacunae.
The texts of Acts 15:6-18:19; James 1:21-1 Peter 3:6; Romans 6:9-11:26 were supplied by later hand. It lacks texts of James 1:23-2:6; Titus 3:11-Philemon 16; Apocalypse 19:-fin.

The text is written in one column per page, and 23 lines per page.

It contains lectionary markings at the margin for liturgical ruse and scholia added by several other hands.

Text 
Kurt Aland the Greek text of the codex placed in Category V.
This means it is a representative of the Byzantine text-type.

History 

According to C. R. Gregory the manuscript was written in the 12th century. Currently the manuscript is dated by the INTF to the 11th century.

It was described by Montana, who sent a description to Kelly.

The manuscript was added to the list of New Testament manuscripts by Scrivener (207a) and Gregory (235a, 125r). In 1908 Gregory gave the number 919 to it.

It is currently housed in the Biblioteca de El Escorial (Y. III. 6) in Escurial.

See also 

 List of New Testament minuscules
 Biblical manuscript
 Textual criticism

References

Further reading

External links 
 

Greek New Testament minuscules
11th-century biblical manuscripts